Ericameria ericoides, known by the common names California goldenbush, mock heather, and California heathgoldenrod, is a species of flowering shrubs in the family Asteraceae. It is endemic to California, where it grows in the sand dunes and coastal hills between the northern San Francisco Bay Area and the Los Angeles area.

Description

It is densely foliated with comblike fans of small cylindrical leaves up to a centimeter long.

Its small erect branches are topped with inflorescences of small golden yellow flower heads, each with several disc florets and a few ray florets.

References

External links

Jepson Manual Treatment of Ericameria ericoides
United States Department of Agriculture Plants Profile for Ericameria ericoides
Ericameria ericoides— Calphoto Photo gallery, University of California

ericoides
Endemic flora of California
Natural history of the California chaparral and woodlands
Natural history of the California Coast Ranges
Natural history of the San Francisco Bay Area
Natural history of the Santa Monica Mountains
Plants described in 1831
Taxa named by Willis Linn Jepson
Flora without expected TNC conservation status